Khalil Zaid Bani Attiah (born 8 June 1991) is a Jordanian professional footballer who plays for the Jordan national football team and for Al-Hussein.

He has a younger brother named Nour Bani Attiah, who plays as a goalkeeper for Al-Faisaly Amman and the Jordan national youth teams.

Career
Khaill's first match with the Jordan national senior team was against North Korea in an international friendly, which resulted in a 1–1 draw, at Sharjah, UAE on 29 March 2011.

International goals

With U-19, U-22, and U-23

With Senior Team

International career statistics

References

External links
 
 
 
 

1991 births
Living people
Jordanian footballers
Jordan international footballers
Jordan youth international footballers
Association football defenders
Association football utility players
2015 AFC Asian Cup players
Expatriate footballers in Saudi Arabia
Expatriate footballers in Bahrain
Expatriate footballers in Qatar
Jordanian expatriate footballers
Jordanian expatriate sportspeople in Saudi Arabia
Jordanian expatriate sportspeople in Bahrain
Jordanian expatriate sportspeople in Qatar
Al-Faisaly SC players
Al-Faisaly FC players
Riffa SC players
Al-Shamal SC players
Al-Hussein SC (Irbid) players
Footballers at the 2010 Asian Games
Sportspeople from Amman
Saudi Professional League players
Qatari Second Division players
Jordanian Pro League players
Bahraini Premier League players
2019 AFC Asian Cup players
Asian Games competitors for Jordan